Dongyuan railway station is a railway station in Beijing.

Schedules 
2 passenger trains stop at the station every day:

Note:  Updated in May 2006, the train schedule will change on October 1, 2006.

Stations on the Beijing–Baotou Railway
Railway stations in Beijing